Jaroslav Hasek's Exemplary Cinematograph is a 1955 Czechoslovak comedy film directed by Oldřich Lipský. The film starred Josef Kemr.

References

External links
 

1955 films
1950s Czech-language films
Films based on works by Jaroslav Hašek
Films directed by Oldřich Lipský
Czech comedy films
Czechoslovak comedy films
1955 comedy films
Czechoslovak black-and-white films
1950s Czech films
Czech anthology films